This is a list of works by Francis Picabia (22 January 1879 – 30 November 1953), French avant-garde artist, painter, poet and typographist, whose work is associated with Cubism, Abstract art, Dada and Surrealism.

Artworks

References

Further reading
 Allan, Kenneth R. “Metamorphosis in 391: A Cryptographic Collaboration by Francis Picabia, Man Ray, and Erik Satie.” Art History 34, No. 1 (February, 2011): 102-125.
 Baker, George. The Artwork Caught by the Tail: Francis Picabia and Dada in Paris. Cambridge, MA: MIT Press, 2007.
 Borràs, Maria Lluïsa. Picabia. Trans. Kenneth Lyons. New York: Rizzoli, 1985.
 Calté, Beverly and Arnauld Pierre. Francis Picabia. Tokyo: APT International, 1999.
 Camfield, William. Francis Picabia: His Art, Life and Times. Princeton: Princeton University Press, 1979.
 Hopkins, David. “Questioning Dada’s Potency: Picabia’s ‘La Sainte Vierge’ and the Dialogue with Duchamp.” Art History 15, No. 3 (September 1992): 317-333.
 Legge, Elizabeth. “Thirteen Ways of Looking at a Virgin: Francis Picabia’s La Sainte Vierge.” Word & Image 12, No. 2 (April–June 1996): 218-242.
 Page, Suzanne, William Camfield, Annie Le Brun, Emmanuelle de l’Ecotais, et al., Francis Picabia: Singulier ideal. Paris: Musée d’Art moderne de la Ville de Paris, 2002.
 Picabia, Francis. I Am a Beautiful Monster: Poetry Prose, and Provocation. Trans. Marc Lowenthal, Cambridge, MA: MIT Press, 2007.
 Pierre, Arnauld. Francis Picabia: La peinture sans aura. Paris: Gallimard, 2002.
 Wilson, Sarah. "Francis Picabia: Accommodations of Desire - Transparencies 1924-1932." New York: Kent Fine Art, 1989.

External links
 Comité Picabia; the organization developing a catalogue raisonné of the artist
 Picabia images at CGFA
 Scans of Picabia's publication, 391
 After 391: Picabia's early multimedia experiments Short essay
 Dada Movement in the MoMA Online Collection

Lists of works of art
Works by artist